Siegfried IV may refer to:

 Siegfried IV von Algertshausen, Prince-Bishop of Augsburg in 1286–1288
 Siegfried IV, Count of Northeim-Boyneburg and Homburg